Michael Graf von Reutern (tr. ) was a Baltic German statesman and the Finance Minister of the Russian Empire from 1862 to 1878.

Life 
He came from the Baltic German noble , his father Christoph Adam von Reutern (1782–1833) was a lieutenant-general in the Imperial Russian Army, his mother was noblewoman Charlotte Elisabeth von Helffreich, he was the nephew of the famous painter Gerhardt Wilhelm von Reutern. The Reuterns were of Holsteinish descent, originating in Lübeck. The family was originally called Reuter, they got their name when Johann Reuter (1635-1698), a merchant, was raised to in the Swedish nobility in 1691.

Reutern graduated from the Tsarskoye Selo Lyceum in 1837. He started his career as a civil servant in the Ministry of Finance in 1840, he was transferred to the Ministry of Justice in 1843, where he remained until 1854. In 1862, he was appointed Finance Minister under the liberal reformist tsar, Alexander II, and introduced a system of public accounting. Reutern's period in office was also marked by the promotion of private credit institutions and attempts to stabilise the ruble. He succeeded in reforming taxation and customs laws, by abolishing the spirits lease and the introduction of an excise tax on brandy. Government revenues rose significantly, the chronic budget deficit was removed in 1867, and budgetary surpluses were achieved from 1873. On trade policy, Reutern pragmatically supported reducing some tariffs and duties on manufacturing goods in 1863 and 1868.
The Russian-Turkish war reversed some of the measures that had led to Reutern's successes, and he resigned in 1878.

References

https://oeconomia.revues.org/559
http://bse.sci-lib.com/article096289.html

1820 births
1890 deaths
Baltic-German people
Counts of Germany
Finance ministers of Russia
Ethnic German people from the Russian Empire
Mikhail